Untomia is a genus of moths in the family Gelechiidae.

Species
 Untomia acicularis Meyrick, 1918
 Untomia albistrigella (Chambers, 1872)
 Untomia alticolens Walsingham, 1911
 Untomia formularis Meyrick, 1929
 Untomia latistriga Walsingham, 1911
 Untomia lunatella Landry, 2010
 Untomia melanobathra Meyrick, 1918
 Untomia rotundata Walsingham, 1911
 Untomia untomiella Busck, 1906

References

 
Anacampsini